Andreas Meyer-Lindenberg (born 31 October 1965) is a German psychiatrist and professor in the Medical Faculty Mannheim at Heidelberg University. He is also the director and CEO of the Central Institute of Mental Health in Mannheim, as well as medical director of their Department of Psychiatry and Psychotherapy. His research includes work on the genetics of complex psychiatric disorders. He has also used neuroimaging to study the neurobiological basis of mental disorders such as Williams Syndrome, and the effects of living in urban areas on mental health and the human brain.

References

External links
Faculty page

1965 births
Living people
German psychiatrists
Academic staff of Heidelberg University
University of Bonn alumni
University of Giessen alumni
University of Hagen alumni